Leslie-Ann Te Atahira Elder (née Ketu; born 10 January 1987) is a New Zealand rugby union player. She debuted for the Black Ferns on 27 June 2015 against Canada at Calgary. She was selected for the 2017 Women's Rugby World Cup squad. She is the Bay of Plenty Rugby Union women's development officer. Prior to the World Cup Ketu was also part of the Black Ferns squad that participated in the 2017 International Women's Rugby Series against Canada, Australia and England.

Elder captained the Chiefs Manawa to their inaugural Super Rugby Aupiki title in 2022. She announced her retirement from rugby on 18 November.

References

External links 
 Lesley Elder at allblacks.com

1987 births
Living people
People from Taumarunui
New Zealand women's international rugby union players
New Zealand female rugby union players